Iain Jenkins (born 24 November 1972) is a football player and coach, who works for the Scottish Football Association (SFA) as an Elite Performance Coach. He began his playing career with Everton, from where he was loaned to Bradford City. He then went on to play for Chester City, Dundee United and Shrewsbury Town before retiring through injury after a second spell at Chester. Born in England, Jenkins was eligible to play for Northern Ireland, for whom he made six international appearances.

Jenkins has managed Scottish junior teams Dundee North End and Tayport, and has also had coaching roles with Chester City, Broughty Athletic, Cowdenbeath and St Mirren prior to joining the SFA.

Playing career
Born in Whiston (then in Lancashire, but now part of Merseyside), Jenkins began his career with Everton and made five league appearances for the club. After a short loan spell at Bradford City, Jenkins moved to Chester City, where he would stay with the Blues five years. He recovered from a car accident in November 1995 to play again within five months and went on to often captain the side before leaving for Dundee United in March 1998. By this point, Jenkins was part of the Northern Ireland squad – making him Chester's first full international since Andy Holden more than a decade earlier.

Injuries restricted Jenkins to just 28 league appearances in two years for Dundee United. Following his release from United in 2000, Jenkins moved south to Shrewsbury Town and then back to Chester City, where he ended his playing career with a handful of appearances.

Coaching and managerial career
Following his retirement, Jenkins became Chester youth coach, before moving to Scottish Junior Football Eastern Region North Division side Broughty Athletic in 2004. After a year there as coach, he became assistant manager at Dundee North End in June 2005, before becoming manager in June 2006. Shortly after leaving his post in May 2008, Jenkins was appointed manager of Tayport, leaving in August 2009 to become assistant manager at Cowdenbeath. winning back to back promotions with the Fife club.

After being offered the manager's job at Cowdenbeath following promotion success it was announced on 11 June 2010 that Jenkins had followed Danny Lennon to St Mirren as his assistant manager; he left the club amicably in July 2011. Since leaving St Mirren, Jenkins became a Scottish Football Association performance coach; as of 2012, he was the dedicated coach for the SFA Performance School project at St John's High School in Dundee.

References

External links

Unofficial international profile

1972 births
Living people
People from Whiston, Merseyside
Association footballers from Northern Ireland
Northern Ireland international footballers
Northern Ireland B international footballers
Association football defenders
Everton F.C. players
Bradford City A.F.C. players
Chester City F.C. players
Dundee United F.C. players
Shrewsbury Town F.C. players
Premier League players
English Football League players
Scottish Football League players
Scottish Premier League players
National League (English football) players
St Mirren F.C. non-playing staff
Chester City F.C. non-playing staff
Scottish Junior Football Association managers
Dundee North End F.C. managers
Tayport F.C. managers